Xiao Zhi may refer to:

Xiao Zhi (Tang dynasty) (died 865), prime minister during Emperor Yizong's reign
Xiao Zhi (footballer) (born 1985)